Since the inception of the men's Rugby World Cup in 1987, a total of twenty one rugby male union players have won the Rugby World Cup twice.

Five Australia players - John Eales, Phil Kearns, Dan Crowley, Jason Little and Tim Horan – were part of both the 1991 and 1999 Wallabies squads. They were joined by South Africa player Os du Randt, who played for the Springboks in their 1995 and 2007 victories. François Steyn became the second South African player to win the competition twice, in the 2007 and 2019 men's Rugby World Cups. 

In 2015, 14 New Zealand players won their second World Cup, having won in 2011. Richie McCaw became the first (and currently only) player to captain his nation to two titles. As coaches, both Steve Hansen and Wayne Smith were involved in New Zealand's 2011 and 2015 victories.

List

References

Rugby World Cup
Rugby union records and statistics
World Cup